Sado Island (Japanese：佐渡島／さどがしま Sadogashima ) is an island located in the eastern part of the Sea of Japan, under the jurisdiction of Sado City, Niigata Prefecture, Japan, with a coastline of . In October 2017, Sado Island had a population of 55,212 people.

Geography 

The shape of Sado Island resembles the word ‘work’ (工) in Japanese or the letter ‘S’. The topography of the island can be roughly divided into three parts, the Ōsado range in the north, the Kosado range in the south, and the Kakakura plain with flat terrain in between. The Ōsado range area is higher in altitude, and the highest peak of Sado Island, Mount Kinpoku ( above sea level), is also located in this area. The coastline on the north side of Mount Sado is steep, and is a famous tourist spot, among which the Senkaku Bay is the most famous. The Kosado range has a relatively flatter terrain with Satsuma orange and tea trees growing there. The Nakakura Plain is a large plain in Japan's outlying islands and is also the agricultural area of Sado Island. On the west side of the Kuninaka Plain is Mano Bay, and on the east side is Ryōtsu Bay. Its watershed area accounts for 20% of Sado Island. Lake Kamo, the largest lake in Niigata Prefecture, is located at the eastern end of the Kuninaka Plain. Lake Kamo was originally a freshwater lake, and later turned into a lagoon after an opening built to the Sea of Japan. Oyster breeding flourishes in the lake. Part of Sado Island belongs to the Sado-Yahiko-Yoneyama Quasi-National Park.

Gallery

Weather and Climate 
Affected by the warm Black Current that passes through the Sado waters, the winter in Sado Island is warmer than that in Niigata Prefecture and with less snow. In summer, due to the influence of ocean, the temperature difference between day and night is smaller than that of Niigata Prefecture, and is cooler than that of Niigata Prefecture. However, the Aikawa area on the northwestern side of the Ōsado range are affected by the monsoon blowing from the northwest and the temperature is higher. Precipitation on Sado Island is mainly concentrated in the end of the East Asian rainy season and early winter, and there is less precipitation than in Niigata Prefecture. When the low air pressure and typhoons pass through the Sea of Japan, Sado Island often suffers from Foehn wind, raising the temperature sharply. Located at the junction of the warm and cold current, Sado City enjoys diverse plants and rich aquatic resources.

History 

With a long history, Sado Island has been inhabited by humans since 10,000 years ago. Thousands of ruins discovered in the Kanai area includes stoneware and hunting equipment from the late Yayoi period. There are also records of Sado in the Kojiki and Nihongi. After the Taika Reform, the central government established the Sado Province on the island, and the local population began to emigrate to Sado Island. At the same time, Sado Island has also become the place where losers of political conflicts or dissidents were exiled. Emperor Juntoku, Nichiren and other people had been exiled to Sado. After the Kamakura period, the Honma clan was appointed as the Shugodai. After 1589 ( Tenshō 17), Uesugi Kagekatsu invaded Sado Island, after which Sado Island was dominated by the Uesugi clan.

In 1601, the miners discovered the gold and silver veins in the Aikawa Tsuruko Ginzan, which is the Sado Mine, for which the status of Sado Island made a great leap. In 1603 (Keichō 8), Tokugawa Ieyasu classified Sado Island as a territory of Bakufu immediately after the victory of the Battle of Sekigahara. Since then, Sado Mine has developed into the largest gold mine in Japan, and the gold output reached 41 tons by Bakumatsu, and played an important role in the finance of the Shogunate. After the middle of the Edo period, the exploitation quantity began to decrease. However, the output returned to the highest level ever of 400 kg per year thanks to the introduction of advanced excavation technology in the Meiji era. In 1989, Sado Gold Mine closed. In nearly 400 years of mining history, it has produced 78 tons of gold and 2,300 tons of silver.

After the Abolition of the han system, the Japanese government established Sado Prefecture on Sado Island (later renamed as Aikawa Prefecture). In 1876, Aikawa Prefecture was incorporated into Niigata Prefecture. In 2004, 10 cities, towns and villages on Sado Island merged into Sado City.

Population 
In 1960, Sado Island had a population of 113,296. Due to the inconvenience of living on the outlying islands and lack of jobs, Sado Island has been experiencing a long-term population decline. In October 2017, the population of Sado Island was 55,212. The total fertility rate of Sado Island is about 1.9, which is much higher than the average of Japan and Niigata Prefecture. However, the continuous outflow of population results in the persistent decrease of population.

Culture 

Since Sado Island is an important trading base on the Nishimawari naval route from the coast of the Japan Sea to Osaka, the culture is strongly influenced by West Japanese culture like Kinki and Hokuriku. Also, intellectuals and politicians exiled from Kyoto to Sado brought the traditional performance culture of Kyoto, thus the traditional art of Sado Island began to thrive. The Noh Master Zeami Motokiyo was exiled to Sado, resulting in the particular development of Noh culture in Sado. In the Edo period, there were more than 200 Noh stages. Sado still has more than 30 Noh stages, and the number of Noh stages per capita ranks first in Japan. There are also local performing arts such as ‘Ghost Taiko’ on Sado Island.

Sado is also home to the Kodō taiko drumming troupe. Kodō are credited with popularizing modern taiko drumming both in Japan and worldwide. Kodō Village is based in the Ogi subdivision.

Transportation

See also
Sado, Niigata (municipality)

References

Notes

External links 

 Sado Tourism Association 
 Sado Geopark 
 Sado Steam Ship 

Islands of the Sea of Japan
Islands of Niigata Prefecture
Sado, Niigata
Coordinates on Wikidata